Sangamon is a county in Illinois. It may also mean:

 the Sangamon River
 Sangamon, Illinois, an unincorporated community in Illinois
 Sangamonian, a climate period 125,000 - 75,000 years ago
 multiple ships named USS Sangamon
 the Sangamon (train), a train operated by the Illinois Terminal Railroad